Sarah Butler may refer to:

 Sarah Butler (actress), American screen actress
 Sarah Hildreth Butler, American stage actress
 Sarah Poage Caldwell Butler, American librarian
 Sarah Zeid (born Sarah Antonia Butler), Jordanian-American humanitarian